The mid-inguinal point (MIP) is located on the inguinal ligament, halfway between the anterior superior iliac spine (ASIS) and the pubic symphysis. It is not to be confused with the midpoint of the inguinal ligament itself, which is located halfway between the anterior superior iliac spine and the pubic tubercle.

Significance
The external iliac artery becomes the femoral artery when it passes deep to the inguinal ligament, at the mid-inguinal point. As such, the point is along the superior boundary of the femoral triangle.

References

Abdomen
Ligaments